, better known by her pen name , is a Japanese manga artist known for her horror and comedy manga series. Her notable works include Yagami-kun no Katei no Jijō, Ogre Slayer, and Girls Saurus.

Biography
Kusunoki was born on 24 March 1966 in Iwakura, Aichi Prefecture. She is married and has a daughter Hana and a son. Kusunoki has collaborated with her twin sister Kaoru Ōhashi, who also works as a manga artist.

Kusunoki has focused most of her career on anime production. She debuted as a manga artist in 1982 in Ribon Original with Nanika ga Kanojo Tōri Tsuita?. Kusunoki had stopped writing manga for a period in order to cope with a miscarriage before returning and writing Bitter Virgin. Most of her works have not been officially translated and published in English.

Works 
 Nanika ga Kanojo Tōri Tsuita? (1982)
 Yagami-kun no Katei no Jijō (1986-1990)
 Blood Reign: Curse of the Yoma (1989)
 Ogre Slayer (1992-2001)
 Dokkan Love (1996)
 Donmai Princess (2000)
 D no Fuuin (2000)
 Diabolo (2001-2003)
 Girls Saurus (2002)
 Girls Saurus DX (2003-2008)
 100 Ways of an Exorcist (2005–present)
 Bitter Virgin (2006-2008) 
 Innocent W (2004-2006)
 Sengoku Nights (2006)
 Vampire (or Kessaku Tanpenshuu Vampire)
 Koi Tomurai
 Yaoyorozu Toushinden Kami-gakari (2009–present)

External links
J-pop.com

1966 births
Living people
Manga artists from Aichi Prefecture
People from Iwakura, Aichi